Sylvester is a town in Boone County, West Virginia, United States, along the Big Coal River. The population was 166 at the 2020 census. Sylvester was incorporated on April 11, 1952 by the Boone County Circuit Court. Sylvester bears the name of a family of settlers.

Geography
Sylvester is located at  (38.010370, -81.559626).  The town's municipal boundaries extend to both sides of the river, though its business district and residential areas lie primarily on the river's eastern bank.  The town of Whitesville lies just to the southeast, and the communities of Orgas and Seth lie just to the north.  West Virginia Route 3 (Coal River Road) traverses Sylvester.

Demographics

2010 census
At the 2010 census there were 160 people, 67 households, and 44 families living in the town. The racial makeup of the town was 98.8% White and 1.3% from two or more races.
Of the 67 households 31.3% had children under the age of 18 living with them, 58.2% were married couples living together, 6.0% had a female householder with no husband present, 1.5% had a male householder with no wife present, and 34.3% were non-families. 32.8% of households were one person and 17.9% were one person aged 65 or older. The average household size was 2.39 and the average family size was 3.05.

The median age in the town was 42 years. 21.9% of residents were under the age of 18; 8.1% were between the ages of 18 and 24; 22.5% were from 25 to 44; 24.4% were from 45 to 64; and 23.1% were 65 or older. The gender makeup of the town was 49.4% male and 50.6% female.

2000 census
At the 2000 census there were 195 people, 84 households, and 66 families living in the town. The population density was 761.4 inhabitants per square mile (289.6/km). There were 94 housing units at an average density of 367.0 per square mile (139.6/km).  The racial makeup of the town was 98.46% White, 1.03% African American, and 0.51% from two or more races. Hispanic or Latino of any race were 0.51%.

Of the 84 households 26.2% had children under the age of 18 living with them, 63.1% were married couples living together, 8.3% had a female householder with no husband present, and 21.4% were non-families. 20.2% of households were one person and 15.5% were one person aged 65 or older. The average household size was 2.32 and the average family size was 2.65.

The age distribution was 18.5% under the age of 18, 4.6% from 18 to 24, 23.1% from 25 to 44, 29.7% from 45 to 64, and 24.1% 65 or older. The median age was 48 years. For every 100 females, there were 84.0 males. For every 100 females age 18 and over, there were 82.8 males.

The median household income was $35,625 and the median family income  was $47,000. Males had a median income of $41,667 versus $25,000 for females. The per capita income for the town was $24,420. About 10.7% of families and 7.7% of the population were below the poverty line, including 8.3% of those under the age of eighteen and 3.9% of those sixty five or over.

References

External links

Towns in Boone County, West Virginia
Towns in West Virginia
Charleston, West Virginia metropolitan area